West Twin Provincial Park and Protected Area is a provincial park and protected area located in the Robson Valley of British Columbia, Canada. It was established on June 29, 2000 to protect local wildlife and to preserve the only protected corridor across Robson Valley.

Facilities
The park is largely undeveloped with only walk-in camping and a single alpine hut available for campers. 

The West Twin Oldgrowth Area, which is located just east of where Hwy. 16 crosses West Twin Creek, is stand of giant and ancient western red cedars that can be viewed from a short hiking trail that loops through the area.

References

Regional District of Fraser-Fort George
Provincial parks of British Columbia